Brothers for Life, also Brothers 4 Life   was a Middle Eastern crime gang, active in south-western suburbs of Sydney, Australia. They came to public prominence largely from internal disputes between the Bankstown chapter and the Blacktown chapter that resulted in a number of shootings in October 2012 to February 2014 that killed two members. Several other gang members were seriously injured. At least one uninvolved person was injured during a shooting. In October 2020, and June 2021 two other people related to the BFL leader, Bassam Hamzy, were killed in shootings.

Operation Apollo and Operation Talon were the police operations to deal with the gang.

History
Legal authorities first heard of BFL in May 2007 from notes found in the Lithgow Gaol cell of Bassam Hamzy, the leader of the gang and a convicted murderer. The gang began in the Bankstown-Greenacre area as a loose association of several other gangs. Brothers 4 Life came to public prominence largely from internal disputes between the Lebanese Australian Bankstown chapter and the Afghan Australian Blacktown chapter.  Hamzy is incarcerated at the Goulburn Correctional Centre in the Supermax section.

2012 shootings 
The gang's activities came to a head on 1 October 2012 when two members Yehye Amood, 27; and Bassim Hijazi, 32; were shot.  Amood died after being hit eight times. Hijazi fled to Lebanon while refusing to assist police investigations into the shooting.

On 8 October 2012 a BFL member, Khaled Khalil, was knee-capped at Yagoona by fellow gang members.

On 17 October 2012 a drive-by shooting targeted a home in Winston Hills that was allegedly linked to BFL members.

2013 shootings 
On 9 February 2013 at Bass Hill another unnamed BFL member was knee-capped. In an important breakthrough this person became a police informant known as 'Witness A'.

On 19 February two BFL members were arrested. Michael Odisho, 28, and Faoud Ekermawi, 35, were arrested in connection with the shooting in Winston Hills in October 2012, and the Bass Hill kneecapping in February 2013. This was a result of information from Witness A. 

On 9 March in Auburn, Maha Hamze, the aunt of BFL leader Bassam Hamzy, was shot eight times in the legs through the front door of her home. 28 cartridge cases were recovered by police. It is believed the shooting was a payback over a demand for a debt recovery fee of $5,000 that the woman's son, made to another man's mother. A 28-year-old man was charged on 16 May with "shooting Maha Hamze with intent to kill". On 28 October 2014 the man, unnamed for legal reasons, was found guilty in the District Court of New South Wales of the attempted murder of Hamze. He was due to be sentenced on 18 December. In June 2021, Bilal Hamze was shot dead.

On 25 July 2013 in Dunmore Street, Wentworthville, shots were fired at two people Ashkan Rajabi and Bilal Hamze in a car parked outside a swimming pool.

On 2 August shots were fired at a dwelling in Lignite Place, Eagle Vale.

Just after midnight on 29 October in Bardo Circuit, Revesby Heights, another BFL member, Mahmoud Hamzy, 27, was shot dead. Mahmoud Hamzy was a cousin of Bassam Hamzy. In the same shooting Omar Ajaj, 24, also a BFL member, was wounded. Mahmoud's cousin Mohammed Hamzy was also present but escaped through the back door. On 27−28 October 2014, five BFL members were arrested and charged with Hamzys' murder.

Less than a week later on 3 November at Winston Hills, previously arrested BFL member Michael Odisho was shot several times. Before BFL, Odisho was a member of the Assyrian Kings gang.

On 4 November in Sunnyholt Road, Blacktown, a 13-year-old girl was wounded by shotgun pellets. Her brother Masood Zakaria, a BFL member, is alleged to have been the target.

On 7 November three BFL Bankstown chapter members, Abdul Abu-Mahmoud, Hassan Souied and Khalil Khalil, were in a car outside the Chokolatta Cafe in Bankstown when four members of the gangs' Blacktown chapter allegedly shot at them in a drive-by shooting. Four men were arrested in Parramatta about 40 minutes after the shooting. On 11 November Sarkhel Rokhzayi, 22, Mobin Marzei and Wahed Karimi, both 18, and Jamil Qaumi, 20, were charged in Burwood Court. A total of 72 charges were laid against the four, including attempted murder and firing a sawn-off shotgun. Amanda Crowe, 27, was also charged with "wounding with intent to kill" in relation to the Cafe shooting. Other charges laid against her were: "knowingly directing activities" of the B4L, and participating in a criminal group. She was released on 1.3 million bail, before being re-arrested at her home in Dulwich Hill in 2014 on 27 October. She had additional charges laid of: the murder of Mahmoud Hamzy; conspiring to murder Mohammed Hamzy; and wounding Ajaj. It was alleged in Burwood Local Cort that Crowe drove the white Nissan Tiida carrying the three gunmen who killed Mohammed Hamzy.

On 16 December, Joe Antoun, a standover man, was shot dead at his home in Jersey Road, Strathfield. Antoun answered a knock on his front door and was shot several times. Vasko Boskovski, his business partner was killed at Earlwood months before in a similar shooting. On 27 October 2014, two of four BFL members, already in custody for the killing of Mahmoud Hamzy and the Chokolatta Cafe shooting, were also charged with murder over the Antoun shooting.

2014 shootings 
In the early hours of  1 January (New Year's Day) a BFL member Farhad Qaumi, 31, was shot in Rose Bay, Sydney. He was on board the charter yacht Oscar II as it  was pulling into a wharf when the vessel was shot at multiple times. Qaumi was treated at St Vincent's Hospital for a shoulder wound but discharged himself. He refused to cooperate with police. Media reports indicated "at least 18 holes" in the vessel.

On 11 March in Auburn in a drive-by shooting, five shots were fired into a fence and car outside the home of BFL member Omar Ajaj. At the time Ajaj was in jail.

On 11 December in Auburn at about 8.30pm, Bassam Hamzys mother Lola Hamzy was shot through her home’s front door. She was taken to Westmead Hospital, where she underwent emergency surgery.

2020 shooting 
Mejid Hamzy, younger brother of Bassam Hamzy, was killed during what police believe was a targeted daylight shooting in Condell Park on 19 October 2020.

2021 shootings 
On 17 June in Sydney's CBD at about 10:25pm, Bilal Hamze was killed in a drive-by shooting on Bridge Street near Mr Wongs restaurant. It was reported that the gunman fled the scene in a dark-coloured Audi.

On 20 October in Guildford, Sydney, at about 8:55am, Salim Hamze and Toufik Hamze were killed in a double shooting on Osgood Street.

Police action

Arrests 
On 7 November 2013 police arrested ten members of BFL.

Nick Kaldas, New South Wales Deputy Police Commissioner said:

Strike Force formed  
At the end of 2013 MEOC formed 'Strike Force Sitella' to investigate numerous shootings and related crimes from July to November 2013.

Legislation 
On 30 January 2014 legislation was tabled in the New South Wales Parliament to have anyone wearing the insignia and symbols used by BFL banned from entering licensed premises (pubs or clubs) in Kings Cross. The bill extends existing legislation that already banned  members of 22 outlaw motorcycle clubs if they wore "any clothing, jewellery or accessory" or "any image, symbol, abbreviation, acronym or other form of writing that indicates membership of, or an association with, any of the organisations specified", by adding "Brothers 4 Life" and "Outlaws" to the banned list.

Charges

2013 

Omar Ajaj has been charged with the murder of Yeyah Amood, and with discharging a firearm with intent to cause grievous bodily harm in relation to the knee-capping in Yagoona.
Mahmoud Sanoussi, 28, was also remanded in custody over the Yagoona knee-capping.

2014 

On 21 January 2014, two men were charged with the murder of Joe Antoun. A 25 year old, Navid Khalili is alleged to have committed the murder. 24 year old Kasim Ali Khan allegedly planned the killing, and drove the car used. Both are believed by police to be BFL members.

On 6 February 2014 a man accused of being the leader of the Bankstown branch of BFL was charged by MEOC detectives with: "Possess prohibited firearm; Aggravated break and enter (special circumstances); Fire at dwelling house, and Direct criminal group." All charges related to the shooting at Lignite Place, Eagle Vale, on 2 August 2013.

On 14 July 2014 Nazir Akbari and Ashkan Rajabi was charged with "discharging a firearm with intent to cause grievous  bodily harm" and "firing a firearm in a public place." He was already in jail on other matters. On the same day six other B4L members were charged over the October 2013 home invasion.  Farhad Quami, 31, Mumtaz Quami, 29, Navid Khalili, 25, Fazal Bari, 24, Mobin Mirzaei, 22, and Jamil Quami, 22, 24 Afshin Rajabi were all charged with "discharging a firearm with intent to cause grievous bodily harm" and weapons offences. All were also charges with serious animal cruelty. The charges were laid by MEOCS detectives from Strike Force Sitella

On 27 October four people; Amanda Crowe, 32; Fahed Quami, and his brothers Mumtaz, and Jamil, 22, were charged in Burwood Court with murder in connection with the 27 October 2013 shooting of Mahmoud Hamzy. In addition Farhad and Mumtaz were also charged with the 21 January 2014 shooting murder of Joe Antoun.

Convictions 
In April 2016 Michael Odisho was found guilty of involvement in the February 2013 knee-capping at Bass Hill of another B4L member. The police alleged "...he handled the gun used in the shooting, loading it and then passing it on...". He was convicted on three counts of reckless wounding and gun possession. Odisho was due to be sentenced in June 2016.

On 28 February 2017 brothers Farhad and Mumtaz Qaumi were convicted of the contract murder of standover man Joe Antoun on 16 December 2013 at his home in Strathfield, Sydney.

References

External links 
 Brothers 4 Life - their undoing exposed Matthew Benns and Mark Morri The Daily Telegraph 9 November 2013

Gangs in Australia
Organised crime in Sydney